Slumberjack (stylised in all caps) is an Australian electronic music duo consisting of Morgan Then and Fletcher Ehlers. Their 2017 single, "Fracture", peaked at 89 on the ARIA Charts.

Members

Morgan Then 
Morgan Then was raised in Borneo, before moving to Perth for university. Self proclaimed "handsomer half of Slumberjack", Then has had a long relationship with his love for music, growing up listening to world music and learning piano from his father from a young age.

Fletcher Ehlers 
Ehlers was born in Perth, but moved with his close family and lived his early years into Vietnam before moving back to Perth 10 years later. His parents had always fond of house music, which gave him an early appreciation for electronic music in general.

Career

Creation of Slumberjack 
Then and Ehlers met at a DJ competition in 2011, where they became familiar with one another's work. Ehlers won the competition in 2011 while Then won in 2012, and afterwards they found themselves hanging out as friends, which naturally led to hanging out in the studio. They had the opportunity to get in the studio with Mr Carmack, the day where things truly started to fall into place for Slumberjack. A few singles later, they had enough material for a debut EP which quickly received traction in Australia, as well as receiving ample support from Triple J, pushing Slumberjack to become a staple electronic artist.

2013-2015: Debut 
After meeting a year prior while at a DJ Competition, Then and Ehlers started working on music together, and it wasn't long before they found themselves in the studio working on new music alongside Mr Carmack. They released their self titled EP to critical acclaim, getting adds on Triple J and launching them into the mainstream early in their career. They spent their 2015 touring alongside Alison Wonderland, playing "secret warehouse shows" and any time not touring was spent working on new music.

2016-2019: "Open Fire" to Sarawak 
During this time, much of their work became collaborative, and they began linking with many different artists in preparation for their next EP Fracture. Working with artists like Vera Blue and Sydnee Carter, Fracture led to their first headlining tour, and the overall visual aesthetic of Slumberjack, mainly in their live shows, was developed throughout this time. In late 2017, they were invited to do a "triple j Like A Version" performance alongside K. Flay, where they played a cover of the song "Paper Planes" by M.I.A.

In 2018, Slumberjack began production on a new EP titled Sarawak, featuring another eclectic mix of collaborators including TroyBoi and Ekali. The release of SARAWAK in 2019 led to their most ambitious worldwide tour alongside fellow collaborators TroyBoi, Ekali, and Alison Wonderland.

2020-Present: Black & Blue to Dichotomy 
Slumberjack kicked off 2020 with the EP "Black & Blue" featuring various collaborations with artists like Daktyl and FOMO. Around this time Slumberjack started releasing their "Distillation Mixes", pulling a mix of Slumberjack originals as well as some of their favorite tracks that's inspired their sound. The release of "Poison" featuring Sydnee Carter marked the first single as part of their first full-length album, "Dichotomy". Following "Poison", their next release was a double single titled "Memory" and "The Reprise". Shortly after, Slumberjack won Best Electronic Producer in the WAM Awards. "DICHOTOMY" is slated for release in late 2021.

Discography

Studio albums

Extended plays

Singles

Remixes

Awards and nominations

WAM Awards
The Western Australian Music Industry Awards (commonly known as WAMis) are annual awards presented to the local contemporary music industry, put on by the Western Australian Music Industry Association Inc (WAM).
|-
| 2020
| Slumberjack
| Best Electronic Producer
|

AIR Awards
The Australian Independent Record Awards (commonly known informally as AIR Awards) is an annual awards night to recognise, promote and celebrate the success of Australia's Independent Music sector.

|-
| AIR Awards of 2018
|Fracture 
| Best Independent Dance/Electronic Album
| 
|-

National Live Music Awards
The National Live Music Awards (NLMAs) are a broad recognition of Australia's diverse live industry, celebrating the success of the Australian live scene. The awards commenced in 2016.

|-
| National Live Music Awards of 2016
| Themselves
| Live Electronic Act (or DJ) of the Year
|

Triple J Unearthed Awards
Australia's Listen Out award is given to 4 different artists each year, and offer the chance to perform at the Listen Out festival, which started in 2013.

|-
| 2014
| Themselves
| Listen Out Winner
|

References

Monstercat artists
Australian electronic dance music groups
Musical groups established in 2014
2014 establishments in Australia
Living people
Year of birth missing (living people)